The communauté de communes du Bocage Bourbonnais is a communauté de communes, located in the Allier department of the Auvergne-Rhône-Alpes region of France.

Communal territory

Composition 
The communauté de communes is composed of the 25 following communes:

Demographics

Administration

Seat 
The seat of the communauté de communes is located in Bourbon-l'Archambault.

Presidency

See also 

 List of intercommunalities of the Allier department

References 

Bocage_Bourbonnais
Bocage_Bourbonnais